Berglind Lára Gunnarsdóttir (born 17 February 1993) is an Icelandic basketball coach and former player who played 26 games for the Icelandic national basketball team. She spent her entire playing career with Snæfell where she won three straight national championships from 2014 to 2016 and the Icelandic Basketball Cup in 2016. In 2017, she was named to the Úrvalsdeild Domestic All-First Team.

Career

First years
Berglind came up through the junior ranks of Snæfell, playing her first senior match during the 2007–2008 season in the second-tier 1. deild kvenna where she helped the club to a perfect 16-0 season and a promotion to the top-tier Úrvalsdeild kvenna.

Injuries plagued her next few seasons, she tore a cruciate ligament in her knee which required two operations and during 2012–2013 season she repeatedly dislocated her shoulder after having initially injured it during the summer.

Snæfell's rise to the top
Berglind helped Snæfell reach the Icelandic Cup finals in 2014 but missed the game due to a knee injury. Without her, Snæfell lost 70-78 to Haukar. On April 6, she helped Snæfell win its first ever women's national championship after sweeping Haukar 3-0 in the Úrvalsdeild finals.

She won the national championship with Snæfell again in 2015, playing in all but one of Snæfell's games during the playoffs despite dislocating her shoulder in the semi-finals and again in the finals. In 2016, Snæfell won the championship for the third year in a row, beating Haukar 3-1 in the finals. She had 11 points and 4 rebounds in the title clinching game.

Berglind had a breakout season in 2016–2017, averaging 11.6 points and 5.3 rebounds and being named to the Úrvalsdeild kvenna Domestic All-First Team.
She helped Snæfell post the best record during the regular season and once again make it to the Úrvalsdeild finals against  Keflavík. In the finals, Keflavík proved to be to strong and won 3-1.

On December 10, 2017, she scored the game winning layup, after rebounding her own miss, at the buzzer to beat Valur in the final eight of the Basketball Cup. On February 28, 2018, Berglind dislocated her shoulder once again in a loss against Keflavík. In 26 games, she averaged 8.3 points and 3.1 rebounds per game.

Accident
After participating with the national team at the 2019 Games of the Small States of Europe in May 2019, Berglind underwent a surgery on her troublesome shoulder and was expected to miss the first half of the 2019–20 season. Shortly before her expected return, on 10 January 2020, she was involved in a serious accident after a bus she was traveling with, along with more than 40 college students, slid of the road in icy conditions and landed upside down. In the accident, she suffered serious neck and spinal injuries, leaving her partially paralyzed. In August 2020, she had regained the use of her legs.

National team career
Berglind was first selected to the Icelandic national basketball team in 2015 and in total she played 26 games for the team. She was selected to the national team for the EuroBasket Women 2017 qualification where Iceland finished third in its group. In November 2017 she was selected to the team for the EuroBasket Women 2019 qualification. In May 2019 she participated at the 2019 Games of the Small States of Europe where Iceland finished in second place.

Coaching career
In August 2021, Berglind was hired as an assistant coach by reigning Úrvalsdeild kvenna champions Valur.

Personal life
Berglind's sister is basketball player Gunnhildur Gunnarsdóttir, who played for Snæfell and the Icelandic national team.

In February 2021, Berglind worked as an analyst on the basketball postgame show Domino's Körfuboltakvöld.

Awards, titles and accomplishments

Individual awards
Úrvalsdeild Domestic All-First Team: 2017

Titles
Icelandic champion (3): 2014, 2015, 2016
Icelandic Basketball Cup: 2016
Icelandic Supercup (4): 2012, 2014, 2015, 2016
Icelandic Company Cup : 2012
Icelandic Division I: 2008

Accomplishments
Icelandic All-Star game: 2011

References

External links
Icelandic statistics from 2008 at kki.is

1993 births
Living people
Berglind Gunnarsdottir
Berglind Gunnarsdottir
Berglind Gunnarsdottir
Berglind Gunnarsdottir
Berglind Gunnarsdottir
Berglind Gunnarsdottir
Guards (basketball)